USS PCE-867 was a  for the United States Navy during World War II. She was renamed ROCS Yong Tai (PCE-41) and ROCS Shan Hai (PCE-62) after being acquired by the Republic of China Navy on 7 February 1948.

Construction and career
PCE-867 was laid down by Albina Engineer & Machine Works, Portland on 8 July 1942 and launched on 3 December 1942. She was commissioned on 20 June 1943.

After the war on 12 September 1945, she was transferred to the Republic of China Navy as ROCS Yong Tai (PCE-41) under the Lend-Lease program. Yong Tai was commissioned on an unknown date under the command of Lieutenant Colonel Wang Enhua. On 8 June 1947, Yong Tai was transiting from Huludao to Qingdao when a newly assigned second lieutenant Ji Rui armed with a gun fired 7 shots on board the ship, injuring the captain, Lieutenant Colonel Li Yuxi and two other officers. Naval officer Zheng Jiamo was killed during the incident. On the 17th, the ship then arrived in Qingdao and the Qingdao naval authorities were notified of the incident.

On 1 January 1954, the naval fleet was reorganized thus, Yong Tai was renamed to Shan Hai (PCE-62).

During the midnight of 13 November 1965, the ship alongside ROCS Linhuai (AM-51) were underway southeast of Wuqiu when they came under attack during the First Taiwan Strait Crisis. Shan Hai would then be scrapped on an unknown date.

References

PCE-842-class patrol craft
1942 ships
Ships built in Portland, Oregon
Ships transferred from the United States Navy to the Republic of China Navy
Maritime incidents in 1954